"Nob and Nobility"  is the third episode of the BBC sitcom Blackadder the Third, the third series of Blackadder.

Plot
Edmund is disgusted with the English obsession over the Scarlet Pimpernel, the masked vigilante who has saved so many French aristocrats from the Revolution. After Edmund disparages the Pimpernel, two effete noblemen, Topper (Tim McInnerny) and Smedley (Nigel Planer), bet him a thousand guineas that he cannot go to France, rescue an aristocrat and present him at the French Embassy Ball. He accepts, but instead of actually going to France, he takes the far safer course of going to Mrs. Miggins' coffee house to find a French aristocrat willing to pretend he has been rescued. He convinces a French dandy, Le Comte de Frou Frou, to pose as his "rescued" aristocrat, in exchange for 50 guineas and an invitation to the Ball. Le Comte agrees, but laments "If only I had brought my mongoose costume!"

When they arrive at the embassy, however, they are arrested by a revolutionary (Chris Barrie) who has assassinated the ambassador. Blackadder, Frou Frou, and Baldrick are put in a cell. Frou Frou offers each of them a suicide pill, before he is taken away to be tortured. Later, "Madam Guillotine," a mad Frenchwoman, comes to torture Blackadder and Baldrick. Blackadder tricks her into drinking wine spiked with the suicide pill, before she dramatically reveals that she was Smedley, the true identity of the Scarlet Pimpernel, come to rescue them. After a sequence of absurd side effects from the pill, Smedley dies. Seeing that he left the cell door open, Blackadder and Baldrick escape, bumping into Frou Frou on the way out.

Blackadder returns to the Prince with Frou Frou, offering a spectacular account of the rescue, including being shipwrecked, tortured, and breaking into Maximilian Robespierre's bedroom to leave him "a small tray of milk chocolates and an insulting note." After the story, Frou Frou reveals himself to be Topper in disguise, and that he and the "mysteriously missing" Smedley are together the Scarlet Pimpernel. Moments away from exposing Blackadder's treachery, Topper accepts Blackadder's offer of a glass of wine, spiked with Frou Frou's other suicide pill, and also dies. Blackadder convinces the Prince that he is the Scarlet Pimpernel, and collects an "enormous postal order" intended for the hero.

External links
 
 

Blackadder episodes
1987 British television episodes
Television shows written by Ben Elton
Television shows written by Richard Curtis